Kharai-ye Bala (also Romanized as Kharā’ī-ye Bālā) is a village in Ahmadi Rural District, Ahmadi District, Hajjiabad County, Hormozgan Province, Iran. At the 2006 census, its population was 100, in 24 families.

References 

Populated places in Hajjiabad County